Guanano (Wanano), or Piratapuyo, is a Tucanoan language spoken in the northwest part of Amazonas in Brazil and in Vaupés in Colombia. They do not intermarry, but their speech is 75% lexically similar.

Classification
Wanano is a member of the Tucanoan language family, which is found in northwest Amazonia (Stenzel 2004, 20). The Tukanoan family can be sub-categorized into two groups: Western Tukanoan Languages and Eastern Tucanoan Languages, Wanano belonging to the Eastern Tucanoan family (Stenzel 2004, 20). The Eastern Tukanoan group is much larger than the Western Tukanoan family with 16 languages and around 28,000 speakers, while the Western Tucanoan family has 4 languages with around 3,000 speakers (Stenzel 2004, 20).

Wanano/Piratapuyo belongs to the Northern branch of the Eastern Tucanoan languages, along with Tucano.

The Wanano People

Geographic Distribution 
The Wanano people live in northwestern Amazonia, on the Vaupés River. The diaspora of the Wanano people is spread between Brazil and Colombia, the total population is estimated at 1560 (Stenzel 2004, 23), however the population in Brazil is estimated at 447 (Moore 2008, 41). The number of speakers is quite high, it is still the first language of most of the population. It is seen as a healthy indigenous language. (Stenzel 2004, 38).

Early history 
The Jesuits were the first ones to make their way into the area that is inhabited by the Wanano people today. In the late 1700s they established their base in São Gabriel da Cachoeira. Missionary expeditions along with resettlement continued throughout the 1900s. Boarding schools were set up in larger settlements like São Gabriel and students were sent to study there (Stenzel 2004, 28). People from these missionaries would go into villages and encourage the indigenous peoples to abandon their beliefs and practice Christianity, along with speaking Portuguese.

The first documentation of Wanano people came from naturalist Alfred Wallace during his 1852 expedition along the Vaupés River. (Stenzel 2004, 29). Later in 1904, a German ethnologist Theodor Kock-Grünberg conducted research in the Wanano region. He observed their interactions with other indigenous groups, including ceremonies that included dance and burial practices. (Stenzel 2004, 29). Something that has been noted by Stenzel in her research that is an important detail to include is the Wanano people are very multilingual (Stenzel 2004, 31).

Wanano Language Documentation Projects 
The first known work on the Wanano language was a grammatical outline recorded by a Salesian missionary named Antônio Giacone in 1967 (Stenzel 2004, 14). Since then a lot of work has been conducted by Nathan and Carolyn Waltz who have worked with the SIL organization in Colombia from 1963 to 1996 (Stenzel 2004, 14). They have published a pedagogical grammar (Waltz 1976), papers on the aspects of Wanano phonology (Waltz and Waltz 1967, Waltz 1982, Waltz 2002), a volume containing a study of Wanano kinship terms, a grammatical sketch of the language and a long interlinearized text (Waltz and Waltz 1997) and the grammatical overview of Wanano found in the Caro y Cuervo collection (Waltz and Waltz 2000) (Stenzel 2004, 15). In 2007, Nathan Waltz published a Wanano – Spanish dictionary (Waltz 2007).  More research has been done on the Wanano language by Dr. Kristine Stenzel who has been conducting research in the Upper Rio Negro area since 2000. She has published a book on the grammar of Kotiria (Wanano) that discusses the morphology and syntax of the language (Stenzel 2015). Along with this book she has written many articles about different aspects of the Wanano language and people (Stenzel 2005a, 2005b, 2006, 2007, 2008a, 2008b, 2008c, 2009a, 2009b, 2009c, 2010, 2012, 2014) (Stenzel 2015).

Wanano was described in a language documentation project funded by Programa de Documentação de Línguas e Culturas Indígenas (ProDocLin) at the Museu do Índio. The project was coordinated by Dr. Kristine Stenzel and was a teaching workshop of Kotiria pedagogical grammar (Saltarelli 2014).

Dr. Kristine Stenzel has also written articles regarding anthropological aspects of the Wanano people (2010, 2013) (Stenzel 2015) as well in her 2004 dissertation where she discusses cultural aspects such as marriage and multilingualism (Stenzel 2004). Anthropologist Janet Chernela has also studied the Wanano society and published a book called “The Wanano Indians of the Brazilian Amazon” which takes a deeper look into Wanano society (Chernela 1996).

Phonology

Consonants

Nasalization is carried on vowels.

Vowels

Suprasegmental Elements
Syllables may be marked with either a high or low stress accent.  Nasalization is suprasegmental and moves from left to right through a word.

Morphology 

Wanano is a nominative accusative language with an SOV sentence structure that contains the following grammatical categories: nouns, verbs, particles, pronouns, and interrogatives. These are outlined in Stenzel’s Reference Grammar of Wanano (2004). Under nouns Stenzel goes into further detail regarding the animates: human vs non-human animates and inanimates: mass nouns vs count nouns (xi).  Stenzel discusses the pronouns which will be examined further below. For verbs Wanano have suffix morphemes that indicate evidentiality, as well as imperative, interrogative and irregular morphemes. While there are adverbial morphemes in Wanano, there are no adjectives.

Pronouns 

Pronouns in Wanano are categorized by personal, possessive, interrogative and demonstrative. A like English, gender is seen in 3rd person pronouns only. The pronouns are categorized into deictic for 1st and 2nd person and anaphoric for 3rd person.

Personal Pronouns

(Stenzel, 2004, 161).

Possessive Pronouns

(Stenzel, 2004, 194)

Interrogative Pronouns

(Stenzel, 2004, 201)

Demonstrative Pronouns

(Stenzel, 2004,155-156).

Examples

Other Morphological Aspects of Wanano 
Gender coding of nouns is a morphological aspect discussed in the grammar of Wanano. Nouns with human referents are obligatorily marked for gender, most noun roots with human referents are masculine, otherwise feminine if marked by morpho-phonological means (Stenzel, 2004, 128). The gender coding suffix -ko that appears at the end of the noun is feminine while   -kʉ is masculine, for example phʉ-ko-ro (mother) and phʉ-kʉ-ro (father) (Stenzel, 2004, 130). Sometimes these endings can be reduced to o for feminine and ʉ for masculine. Examples of this are ~ducho-ro (grandmother) and ~duchʉ-ro (grandfather) (Stenzel, 2004, 129).

A mass noun is a noun that has no plural form, not meaning singular but that it is an uncountable referent. For example, you cannot count water however you can weigh it to measure its mass. By adding the morpheme –ro to the root of a mass noun or verb in Wanano, it changes into a count noun (Stenzel, 2004, 139). Some examples of this are: ko (water) is turned into ko-ro (rainstorm) by adding –ro; tha (grass) is turned into tha-ro (field). (Stenzel, 2004, 139).

Syntax
Wanano is a nominative-accusative case system, this means that the subject of the transitive and intransitive verbs are marked the same way.

Intransitive 
Intransitive verbs are verbs that require a single nominal argument. Below are some examples.

(Stenzel, 2004, 208)

Transitive 
Transitive verbs are verbs that require two core nominal arguments.

(Stenzel, 2004, 217, 218, 226, 227).

As we can see from the examples above, Wanano is a nominative accusative language. For example, in example 1, 1SG yʉˈʉ is the same as in example 8. In example 9, the 3SG to is the same as in example 3. As well as in example 6 ANPH-SG ti is the same as in example 5.

Transitive motion verbs 
Transitive motion verbs frequently occur with adjunct expressions coded only by the locative -pʉ and there are certain motion verbs in Wanano which can be syntactically transitive. In other words, they take a second, oblique argument coded by -pʉ-re. (Stenzel, 2004, 234)

Wanano is typologically nominative-accusative, and that it codes the grammatical rather than the semantic roles of core arguments. (Stenzel, 2004, 255)

Semantics

Plural morphemes in Wanano 
The most common plural morpheme used in Wanano is -a/ ̴da. The alternation between the two is still unclear however there is a tendency for ̴da to be used for animates with human referents, for example pho’da (children), while –a is used for other animates (Stenzel, 2004, 131). When pluralizing male or females the morphemes - ̴sʉba (male) and ̴sa ̴dubia (female) are used. Some examples of this are:

(Stenzel, 2004, 132)

For pluralizing animals, since they are non-human the morpheme –a is used. There are some exceptions where –ya is used. Some examples of this are:

(Stenzel, 2004, 134).

If you take the word for dogs, for example, die-ya, and you want to say female dogs, you add the word for women ( ̴dubia).

References 

ANPH:anaphoric
PART:partitive case
VIS:visual
PERF:perfective aspect
IMPERF:imperfective aspect
INT:interrogative
PROX:proximate
DEIC:deictic
REM:remote
ASSERT:assertion
CLS:classifier
OBJ:object
EXC:exclusive person
NOM:nominalizer
TMP:temporal
IMPER:imperative
PREDICT:predictive
MOV:movement
NON:non

Further reading 
 
Chernela, Janet M. "The Wanano Indians of the Brazilian Amazon." - University of Texas Press. N.p., 1996. Web. 16 Oct. 2016. (http://utpress.utexas.edu/index.php/books/chewan)
Moore, D., Galucio, A. V., & Junior, N. G. (2008).Desafio de documentar e preservar línguas. Scientific American Brasil, 3, 36-43. Web. 29 Sept. 2016 (http://saturno.museu-goeldi.br/lingmpeg/portal/downloads/publicacoes/desafio-de-documentar-e-preservar-moore-galucio-gabas.pdf) 
Saltarelli, Denise. "Os Kotiria Do Amazonas Elaboram Gramática Pedagógica - Museu Do Índio." Os Kotiria Do Amazonas Elaboram Gramática Pedagógica - Museu Do Índio. N.p., 2014. Web. 16 Oct. 2016. (http://www.museudoindio.gov.br/divulgacao/noticias/384-os-kotiria-do-amazonas-elaboram-gramatica-pedagogica)
 
 
Waltz, Nathan E., compiler; Jones, Paula; Waltz, Carolyn H., editors. 2007. Diccionario bilingüe: Wanano o Guanano—Español, Español—Wanano o Guanano. 1st ed. Bogotá, D.C.:  Editorial Fundación para el Desarrollo de los Pueblos Marginados. Web. 16 Oct. 2016. (http://www.sil.org/americas/colombia/pubs/abstract.asp?id=928474518821)

External links 
 Recordings of narratives, stories, conversations, and ceremonies in Piratapuyo and Kotiria, from the Tucanoan Languages Collection of Janet Chernela at AILLA.
"Stenzel, Kristine | Federal University of Rio de Janeiro - Academia.edu." Kristine Stenzel | Federal University of Rio de Janeiro - Academia.edu. N.p., 2015. Web. 16 Oct. 2016. (http://psigma.academia.edu/KristineStenzel/CurriculumVitae) 

Tucanoan languages
Languages of Brazil
Languages of Colombia